Sambreville is a municipality of Wallonia located in the province of Namur, Belgium. 

On January 1, 2006, Sambreville had a total population of 26,949.

Villages and towns
The municipality was created in 1977, as part of the post-1974 fusion of the Belgian municipalities, bringing together the ancienne communes (now towns and villages) of:
Arsimont
Auvelais
Falisolle
Keumiée
Moignelée
Tamines
Velaine

Tamines is associated with the Rape of Belgium during World War I. At least 384 townspeople were massacred, including women and children.

Twin towns
 Gessopalena, Italy

See also
 List of protected heritage sites in Sambreville

References

External links
 

 
Municipalities of Namur (province)